Ledi may refer to:

People
 Ledi Bianku (born 1971), Albanian judge
 Ledi Sayadaw (1846–1923), Burmese monk
 Ledi Utomo (born 1983), Indonesian football player

Places
 Ben Ledi, Scotland
 Ledi, Ayadaw, Myanmar
 Ledi, Minbu, Myanmar
 Ledi, Myaing, Myanmar
 Ledi, Pandaung, Myanmar
 Ledi, Pauk, Myanmar
 Ledi, Ye-U, Myanmar
 Ledi-Geraru, Ethiopia

Species
 Chrysomyxa ledi, fungus
 Chrysomyxa ledi var. rhododendri
 Coleophora ledi, moth of the family Coleophoridae
 Lyonetia ledi, moth in the family Lyonetiidae

Other
 LED Incapacitator